Thorpe Astley is a suburban settlement on the southwestern edge of the city of Leicester, England. It is part of the civil parish of Braunstone Town, although a small part of the development, around Goodheart Way, extends into Leicester Forest East civil parish. Both Braunstone Town and Leicester Forest East are within the district of Blaby, Leicestershire.

This settlement was built on the last area of agricultural land in Braunstone Town. Construction of this development began after approval from the Blaby District Council in 1994. It covers most of a wedge of land between the M1 Motorway on its western side and the A563 ringroad on the east, with the established community of Braunstone West is on its north side. It is neighboured to the south by the Meridian industrial and commercial development.

A Community Centre to serve this housing estate was opened in October 2010; this is maintained by Braunstone Town Council. Around the same time a new community group was formed, Your Thorpe Astley, with the aim of furthering the interests of local residents and staging events at the Centre.

The name "Thorpe Astley" was derived from the Astley family, who owned land in Braunstone Town from 1334 to 1404.

Several roads in the Thorpe Astley estate are named after famous people from history, including the 18th-century political radical Thomas Paine and American paratroop commander General James M. Gavin. The headquarters of General Gavin's U.S. 82nd Airborne Division was stationed at Braunstone Park during 1944.

Transport
Thorpe Astley is served by Centrebus service 40 circle line which operates a circular route around outer Leicester. 

Vectare run the NovusDirect from the estate of New Lubbesthorpe through Thorpe Astley, into Leicester, and also run NovusFlex, which can be ordered through an app. On Sundays, Vectare also run NovusRetail, which runs from New Lubbesthorpe to Fosse Park.

Arriva no longer run any services into Thorpe Astley after removing the 104 service from running to Thorpe Astley.

Thorpe Astley is around 5 minutes away from the M69 and M1 Junction 21.

Culture

Leisure and Entertainment
Meridian Leisure Park is located about 5 minutes away from Thorpe Astley, containing a bowling alley ran by Hollywood Bowl, a Vue cinema, a childrens play area, a David Lloyd fitness business and several restaurants. 

Meridian Business Park is located about 5 minutes away, containing multiple businesses, various pubs and hotels, a McDonalds, and a Costa Coffee, as well as a local fire station.

Fosse Park is a 5 minute drive away and accessible by bus.

See also
Braunstone Town

References

External links
Thorpe Astley - Braunstone Town

Braunstone, Leicester
Suburbs in the United Kingdom